Nine Mile or Ninemile may refer to:

Places

Australia 

 Nine Mile, Queensland, a locality in the Rockhampton Region

Canada 

 Nine Mile Lake, Nova Scotia

Jamaica 

 Nine Mile, Jamaica, home town of Bob Marley

Papua New Guinea 

 Nine Mile, Morobe Province,

United States 

Nine Mile, Indiana, an unincorporated community
Ninemile, Ohio, an unincorporated community
Ninemile Canyon, in eastern Utah
Nine Mile Prairie, a tract of conserved tallgrass prairie in Nebraska
Ninemile Island (Pennsylvania), in the Allegheny River

Other places 

Nine Mile River (disambiguation), multiple rivers
Ninemile Creek (disambiguation)

Transport 

 Nine Mile Road (disambiguation), various roads
 Nine Mile (RTD), a transit station in Aurora, Colorado
 Nine-Mile Circle, a defunct streetcar line in Atlanta

Other uses 

 Nine Mile (band), a Canadian pop-rock band based in Toronto